Ishq Parast is a Pakistani television drama series,  aired on ARY Digital from 19 February 2015 to 23 July 2015. It is written by Mohsin Ali, produced by Big Bang Entertainment, and directed by Badar Mehmood with the prime slot of 9:00p.m. every Thursday on ARY Digital. It stars Armeena Rana Khan, Syed Jibran and Arij Fatyma in leading roles.

Cast

Plot

Ishq Parast is a story about a young, beautiful and charming girl Dua (Armeena Khan), who has her own fantasies and dreams about her love and life. Dua comes from a very typical middle-class background, her parents are old fashioned and strict and knowing fully well that girls in her family always go for arranged marriages. She has promised herself to have the best version of everything about herself in her life. Falling in love with Hamza was the unsurpassed part of her life.

Hamza ( Ahmed Ali ) comes from a broken family, he has been scared for life. He is blunt, extremely emotional, very possessive and highly impulsive. Another feather was added in his cap, when he flunked in college and wasted a year just so he could be with Dua. He has no direction in life, only looks for a job so he can marry Dua.

Zohaib (Syed Jibran) had lost his parents at an early age. Whether whatever the reason is the loving brother is always supporting his sister and doing all possible things to make her happy. Arsala has got him wrapped around her little finger and he couldn't be happier. Arsala (Arij Fatyma) is naughty girl who keep on teasing her Aunt and her brother. She can't live without her brother as she was only 6 years old that she lost her parents so her brother brought her up and fulfilled all her wishes. She wanted her brother to marry immediately with any girl.

Zohaib and Arsala went on a shopping mall where Zohaib first saw Dua who came their with friend to meet Hamza. Hamza went away after receiving a phone call from someone. Zohaib lovely expression forced Arsala to talk that girl. Arsala got the number and address of Dua's friend. After the proposal of Zohaib and fixing the marriage, Dua’s father refused to even meet Hamza but this is where the trouble starts. Dua has bluntly refused to marry anyone but Hamza.

Dua’s parents are still forcing and emotionally blackmailing her into marrying Zohaib. Hamza is still in Islamabad for job purpose, blissfully unaware of everything that is happening in Dua's life and Zohaib and his family are happily making preparations for the upcoming wedding. Zohaib has no idea what’s going on at Dua's house and the way things are going.

Dua is miserable, torn between her love for Hamza and her parents, she is trying endlessly on one hand to contact Hamza and on the other hand to convince her parents. Sadly, she isn’t having much luck at either front. Dua's father confiscate her phone. Hamza thinks Dua is mad at him for not answering her call, so to punish him she has switched her phone off.

His father make a drama of heart attack. Dua's parents made her feel so guilty and bad for no reason. No wonder the poor girl gave in to their constant emotional blackmailing. So she agree to marry Zohaib. On first wedding night Dua revealed everything to him. Dua waking up the next day, the body language and expressions said it all, she was uncomfortable in this new place with Zohaib. Zohaib acted like it was just another day and didn’t do or say anything to make Dua feel bad. They got along fairly well and were able to fool everyone from Arsala and Khala to Dua's parents, that they were a happily married couple. Arsala explain to Dua that theirs is a small family but they are tightly bonded and yes her brother is a gem of a person. On family instigate Zohaib and Dua went for honeymoon.

Hamza leaves his job and went back. Hamza's friend was trying really hard to calm and down and keep him away from Dua. He knows too well what Hamza is capable of and he wants to save Dua from any embarrassing situation. But Dua's own friend went to Hazma to explain to him that Pasha sahab lied and faked a heart attack to get Dua married to Zohaib. Now that Hamza knows, Dua was tricked into marrying Zohaib. Dua's friend even told Hamza where the newly married couple had gone for their honeymoon.

Dua feels awkward in Zohaib's presence but he is always such a gentleman, helping Dua with her heavy suitcases, putting her worries to rest about the honeymoon trip and yes getting her, her own separate room on their honeymoon. Hamza even appeared like a ghost on their honeymoon and scared Dua.

Hamza is fuming with anger our her marriage with Zohaib. He forced Dua to take divorce from his husband Zohaib but seeing the love of Zohaib she denied him. Then Hamza tried to take revenge from dua . He married Dua's sister-in-law Arsala. Arsala being loved by everyone in home asked hamza to be gharjamai. Everyone agrees. Hamza joins Zohaib's office. He hit Zohaib by his car. While everyone was in hospital Hamza crossed all the limits and took advantage. Dua gets pregnant and Arsala leaves the house on family issues. Hamza tell everything to Dua's father, who can't bear it and died with heart attack.

Zohaib and his aunt get to know about every thing and are worried about Arsala. Hamza leaves Zohaib's office and he is jobless. Khala went to their house and knows that Hamza usually scolds Arsala. She informs everything to Zohaib and he gives khulah papers to Hamza. When he tells that to Arsala, she breaks every relationship with Zohaib and Dua. When Arsala knows the truth, she felt so disappointed, she drove the car in which she and Hamza are sitting, so fast and kills herself and Hamza by an accident. The drama ends with Zohaib's Daughter talking to her aunt's grave (Arsala) and celebrating Arsala's 6th death anniversary.

Reception
Ishq Parast was the most watched show of 2015. Arij Fatyma was admired for her superb performance.

References

External links
 
 All Episodes 
 Ishqa Waay 

ARY Digital
Pakistani drama television series
Urdu-language television shows